Alosa maeotica, known as the Black Sea shad or Azov shad, is a species of clupeid fish endemic to the Sea of Azov and the western part of the Black Sea basin. It is found in Bulgaria, Georgia, Moldova, Romania, Russia, Turkey, and Ukraine.

This is one of the several shad species endemic the Ponto-Caspian basin. Note that the same common names (Black Sea shad, Azov shad) are connected also to another species, Alosa tanaica.

Notes

References

maeotica
Fish of the Black Sea
Fish of the Sea of Azov
Fish of Europe
Fish described in 1901
Least concern biota of Europe
Taxonomy articles created by Polbot